is a Latin phrase often used as a motto, which translates into English approximately as "Even if all others, not I". 

It is the motto of the family of Clermont-Tonnerre; the title of a poem by Ernest Myers and the inscription on the tombstone of Italian philosopher Giuseppe Rensi. It is also the motto of the Italian Joint Special Forces Operations Headquarters.

The last part of the phrase, in its German translation, is the title of an autobiographical work of Joachim Fest: .

A longer adaptation of the phrase can be seen in a passage from the Vulgate Gospel of Matthew :  (Ei pantes skandalisthēsontai en soi, egō oudepote skandalisthēsomai.)

See also
Latin phrases
Philipp von Boeselager

References

Boeselager family
Latin mottos
Vulgate Latin words and phrases
New Testament Latin words and phrases
Gospel of Matthew